Muutoksen kevät (Finnish: Spring of Change) was a Finnish quarterly political magazine which covered environmental issues and topics related to human and animal rights. It was based in Tampere, Finland, and was in circulation from 1995 to 2003.

History and profile
Muutoksen kevät was established in Fall 1995, and the first issue was published April 1996. It was headquartered in Tampere and was published on a quarterly basis. The magazine featured articles about environment, human rights and animal rights. The magazine supported the idea that ecological change could be achieved through political activism. Muutoksen kevät ceased publication due to financial problems, and its last issue, numbered 30, appeared in Fall 2003.

References

1995 establishments in Finland
2003 disestablishments in Finland
Defunct political magazines published in Finland
Environmental magazines
Finnish-language magazines
Magazines about animal rights
Magazines established in 1995
Magazines disestablished in 2003
Mass media in Tampere
Quarterly magazines published in Finland